Peter Eric Done (born 1947) is an English billionaire businessman, the founder and group managing director of Peninsula Business Services, established in 1983.

Done was born in Salford, Lancashire, England in February 1947. His wife is Anna Done (m. 1970) and together they have two children.

Early life 
Born in Salford, England, Peter Done has three siblings. His brother is Fred Done. He attended Trafford Road School. At age 15, he left school along with his brother to work at their father’s illegal bookmaking business. At 17, Done managed a betting shop for another company. “You weren’t even allowed in betting shops until you were 18, and I was managing one at 17”. At age 21, he acquired his own shop in Pendleton, England.

Career

Betfred 
In 1967, Done co-founded his own bookmaking business  with his brother using money they received betting on the 1966-67 World Cup. Originally, their business was named Done Brothers, but eventually it was changed to its current ‘Betfred.’ In its early days Betfred was a family business; Done, his brother, their father, their mother and both of their wives helped run the store throughout the week. Done’s role at the time was as a sales and marketing director.

The 1967 United Kingdom foot-and-mouth outbreak caused many bookmaking businesses to close. Betfred managed to stay afloat by pivoting from horse racing — the major sport that involved betting — to afternoon dog racing.

After 12 months of successfully being in business, Done and his brother decided to expand by buying another storefront. They bought their new shop at £250 and made the money back within the week. Peter managed the second shop while his brother Fred stayed at the first one. Their sister would go on to manage their third shop.

As of 2018 Betfred has over 1,650 shops and a turnover of approximately £10 billion.

Peninsula Business Services 
In 1983 Done and his brother co-founded “Professional Personnel and Management Services Limited” after having to pay £9,000 to settle an employment tribunal. In 2016 this company later became Peninsula Business Services (Peninsula). “We literally tossed a coin, I won, and Fred said ‘you got Peninsula’". The business didn’t find success until Done identified its potential and decided to focus his abilities and time on it. He planned to advertise its services on the road for six months, then return to work with his brother at Betfred. “I was supposed to be coming back from Peninsula after six months and we were going to get a manager in, but 35 years later I’m still in the business". As of 2021, Peter Done is the founder and current managing director of Peninsula.

Peninsula offers advice and counselling to staff of the public sector. As of 2018 Peninsula has over 60,000 businesses subscribed to its services, serves over 30,000 clients, and is made up of over 2,700 staff members. The business operates in the UK, Australia, New Zealand, and Canada. As of 2019, Peninsula began successful expansion in Ireland despite uncertainty caused by Brexit in 2020.

The Canadian Peninsula branch houses over 200 employees, 3,000 clients, and operates in three Canadian provinces (Peninsula Team, 2020).

In 2013, Done injected a cash investment of £1.6 million to improve and develop the HROnline app. This app helped employers manage different types of human resource activities such as sickness, employment, holidays, and lateness recording.

It claims to be the UK’s largest provider of employment law, human resource, health & safety, and employee assistance program consultancy services. Its subsidiaries include Employsure, Peninsula Canada, Croner Tax, Croneri and Croner Group. The company headquarters is the Peninsula Building in Manchester and it employs over 3000 people worldwide.

Business interests
In 2021, the Sunday Times Rich List estimated his net worth at £1.235 billion. Fred and Peter Done and family paid £136.8 million in tax in 2022; fifth place on The Sunday Times Tax List of the UK's 100 biggest taxpayers.

Employsure 
In May 2012, Peninsula Business Services acquired a 65% share of Employsure, an Australian advising firm specializing in industrial relations, which was registered as a company in 2011. The business claims to be the largest in its sector with over 20,000 clients in Australia and 800 employees.

Charity 
Done, along with his brother, have charitable trusts set up. Their main donations are to children (children hospitals, children’s charities). They once donated one day’s worth of Betfred profits to the Royal Manchester Children’s Hospital during the Cheltenham festival. They also once donated £200 per century break played at the Snooker World Championship to the Jessie May children’s charity — the final amount donated was £40,000.

In March 2021, Peninsula raised £1 million for the Royal Manchester Children’s Hospital charity. Due to the Covid-19 pandemic and the increased pressure on the staff, Done decided to increase their pledge to £2 million. Done notes “Peninsula Group are delighted to have reached the remarkable milestone of raising £1 million through our incredible fundraising efforts and the Group matching every donation made. We hope that this impressive donation will help Royal Manchester Children’s Hospital Charity significantly.”

Done and the Peninsula Group reached their £2 million fundraising target at the end of 2022 and vowed to help the hospital further with an addition £1 million pledge in 2023.

Awards and accolades 
In 2015, Done was shortlisted for the Service Industries award by the Great British Entrepreneur awards.

In 2019, Done was awarded the Glassdoor Employees’ Choice Award.

Lifestyle 

Done lives in Salford.

Done supports Manchester United FC and attends football matches with his brother. “That is where we have our board meetings, we just sit there and have a chat about what’s going on".

References 

1947 births
Living people
English billionaires
English businesspeople
Conservative Party (UK) donors